Nagwa Fouad El-Masry (born ) is a retired Egyptian female volleyball player. She was part of the Egypt women's national volleyball team.

She participated in the 2003 FIVB Volleyball Women's World Cup.
On club level she played for Sporting, EGY in 2003.

References

External links

 
 

1983 births
Living people
Egyptian women's volleyball players
Place of birth missing (living people)